The following radio stations broadcast on FM frequency 95.9 MHz:

Argentina
 95.9 Armstrong in Armstrong, Santa Fe
 Blue in Concordia, Entre Ríos
 Caldén in Las Lajas, Neuquén
 Capricornio in Ibarreta, Formosa
 Cielo in Paraná, Entre Ríos
 Del Sol in Formosa
 El Rayo in Viedma, Rio Negro
 Fortaleza in Iguazú, Misiones
 Lider in Quilino, Córdoba
 LRL315 in Buenos Aires
 LRP888 in Pilar, Santa Fe
 Luz in Río Grande, Tierra del Fuego
 Más in Santa Fe de la Vera Cruz, Santa Fe
 Máxima in Rosario, Santa Fe
 Play FM Radio in Córdoba
 Premier in La Leonesa, Chaco
 Radio María in América, Buenos Aires
 Radio María in Azul, Buenos Aires
 Radio María in Chivilcoy, Buenos Aires
 Radio María in Rio Cuarto, Córdoba
 Universo in Vicuña Mackenna, Córdoba
 Vida Tango in Salta 
 Vorterix in San Carlos de Bariloche, Río Negro

Australia
 1233 ABC Newcastle in Port Stephens
 ABC Western Plains in Dubbo, New South Wales
 Triple J in Bathurst, New South Wales
3CCS in Apollo Bay, Victoria
 Radio National in Gladstone, Queensland

Canada (Channel 240)
 CBAF-FM-14 in Sydney, Nova Scotia
 CBMV-FM in Old Fort Bay, Quebec
 CBU-FM-3 in Pemberton, British Columbia
 CFLN-FM-1 in North West River, Newfoundland and Labrador
 CFOB-FM-1 in Atikokan, Ontario
 CFPL-FM in London, Ontario
 CHAP-FM in Chapleau, Ontario
 CHBB-FM in Norris Point, Newfoundland and Labrador
 CHFM-FM in Calgary, Alberta
 CHHI-FM in Miramichi, New Brunswick
 CIAM-FM-16 in Meander River, Alberta
 CIRX-FM-1 in Vanderhoof, British Columbia
 CJFM-FM in Montreal, Quebec
 CJKX-FM in Ajax, Ontario
 CJKX-FM-2 in Toronto, Ontario
 CJWF-FM in Windsor, Ontario
 CKBI-FM in La Ronge, Saskatchewan
 CKMY-FM in Grand Falls-Windsor, Newfoundland and Labrador
 CKSA-FM in Lloydminster, Alberta
 CKUW-FM in Winnipeg, Manitoba
 CKXX-FM-1 in Stephenville, Newfoundland and Labrador
 VF2394 in Moose Jaw, Saskatchewan
 VF2482 in Coal Valley Mine, Alberta
 VF2566 in Barriere, British Columbia

China 
 CNR The Voice of China in Ganzhou

Indonesia
 Smart FM in Jakarta, Indonesia

Ireland
 Clare FM in southeast Clare

Mexico
 XHABCJ-FM in Guadalajara, Jalisco
 XHAMB-FM in Tacámbaro, Michoacán
 XHCJU-FM in Jarretaderas, Nayarit
 XHCOP-FM in Cópala, Jalisco
 XHCSAL-FM in Valladolid, Yucatán
 XHGTO-FM in Guanajuato, Guanajuato
 XHJIQ-FM in Jiquilpan, Michoacán
 XHLIB-FM in Libres, Puebla
 XHPAL-FM in La Paz, Baja California Sur
 XHPBSD-FM in Barrio San Diego (Tlaxiaco), Oaxaca
 XHSCAR-FM in Cadereyta de Montes, Querétaro
 XHVUC-FM in Villa Unión, Coahuila
 XHWD-FM in Ciudad Miguel Alemán, Tamaulipas

Nigeria

 Cool FM 95.9 in Port Harcourt

Philippines
DWBG in Baguio City
DWAL in Batangas City
DZRB-FM in Naga City
DYIF-FM in Bacolod City

South Africa
 Radio Helderberg in Cape Town
 Kaya FM in Johannesburg

South Korea
 MBC Standard FM in Seoul Metropolitan Area

United Kingdom
Andover Radio in Andover, Hampshire
BBC Radio Humberside

United States (Channel 240)
  in Freer, Texas
  in Arnold, California
  in Charles City, Iowa
 KCKH in Mansfield, Missouri
 KCKL in Malakoff, Texas
  in Newton, Iowa
 KCSC-FM in Woodward, Oklahoma
 KFDG-LP in Las Vegas, Nevada
 KFLK-LP in Minot, North Dakota
  in La Mirada, California
 KFWR in Jacksboro, Texas
 KGVM in Bozeman, Montana
  in Goliad, Texas
  in Columbia Falls, Montana
 KIDN-FM in Hayden, Colorado
  in Estherville, Iowa
 KJJZ in Indian Wells, California
  in Sallisaw, Oklahoma
  in Monett, Missouri
 KKET in Allakaket, Alaska
 KKFD-FM in Fairfield, Iowa
 KKHI in Kaunakakai, Hawaii
  in Taos, New Mexico
  in Cottonwood, Arizona
 KLIU-LP in Unalakleet, Alaska
  in Weston, Idaho
  in Winnsboro, Louisiana
 KMPN in Burnet, Texas
 KNIL-LP in Creighton, Nebraska
  in Quincy, California
  in Camarillo, California
 KPCN-LP in Woodburn, Oregon
 KPVS in Hilo, Hawaii
  in Hooks, Texas
  in Faribault, Minnesota
 KQPZ in Lewistown, Montana
 KRFF-LP in Moorhead, Minnesota
  in Healdsburg, California
 KRSL-FM in Russell, Kansas
 KRSX in Goldendale, Washington
 KSCH in Sulphur Springs, Texas
 KSLN-LP in Sullivan, Missouri
  in Winfield, Kansas
  in Poipu, Hawaii
 KSSR-FM in Santa Rosa, New Mexico
 KTIL-FM in Bay City, Oregon
 KUKY in Wellton, Arizona
 KUUZ in Lake Village, Arkansas
  in Harrisburg, Arkansas
  in Hutchinson, Kansas
  in Fairbanks, Alaska
 KXRG-LP in Honolulu, Hawaii
  in Barstow, California
 KYLS-FM in Ironton, Missouri
  in Saint George, Utah
 KZHM in Alamogordo, New Mexico
  in Mansura, Louisiana
  in Quincy, Washington
  in Belle Fourche, South Dakota
  in Sharpsville, Pennsylvania
 WAPQ-LP in Avon Park, Florida
  in Marshfield, Massachusetts
  in Taylorsville, Mississippi
  in Pittsfield, Massachusetts
 WBIT-LP in Erie, Pennsylvania
  in Portage, Wisconsin
  in Potts Camp, Mississippi
  in Queensbury, New York
 WCRI-FM in Block Island, Rhode Island
  in Robbinsville, North Carolina
 WDQN-FM in Duquoin, Illinois
 WEBG in Mina, New York
 WEFM (FM) in Michigan City, Indiana
  in Aurora, Illinois
 WEZC in Clinton, Illinois
  in Franklin, Indiana
 WFOG-LP in Hillsville, Virginia
 WFOX in Southport, Connecticut
  in Maysville, Kentucky
 WGKY in Wickliffe, Kentucky
 WGRL-LP in Saint Cloud, Florida
  in Fairview Beach, Virginia
 WHLR in Seelyville, Indiana
  in Williamsport, Maryland
 WIQI in Watseka, Illinois
 WJIH-LP in Oneonta, New York
 WJKW (FM) in Athens, Ohio
 WJRN-LP in Summerfield, Florida
 WKBP in Benton, Pennsylvania
  in Vevay, Indiana
 WKRI-LP in Richmond, Kentucky
 WKSZ in De Pere, Wisconsin
 WKTZ-FM in Loch Lynn Heights, Maryland
  in Wabash, Indiana
 WKZP in West Ocean City, Maryland
 WLJW-FM in Fife Lake, Michigan
  in Three Rivers, Michigan
  in Forest Lake, Minnesota
 WLQK in Livingston, Tennessee
 WLTE in Pendleton, South Carolina
  in Minocqua, Wisconsin
 WMSZ-LP in Hartsville, South Carolina
 WMXZ in Isle of Palms, South Carolina
 WNJI-LP in Kearny, New Jersey
  in Macomb, Illinois
 WNPQ in New Philadelphia, Ohio
  in Carlinville, Illinois
 WOPT-LP in Waynesville, North Carolina
 WOVU-LP in Cleveland, Ohio
 WOXI-LP in Oxford, Alabama
 WPEI in Saco, Maine
 WPLS-LP in Greenville, South Carolina
 WQQP in Sykesville, Pennsylvania
  in Dublin, Georgia
  in Point Pleasant, New Jersey
 WRBA in Springfield, Florida
  in Camden, Tennessee
 WROK-FM in Sebastian, Florida
 WRZK in Colonial Heights, Tennessee
  in Princeton, West Virginia
  in Tuskegee, Alabama
  in Guntersville, Alabama
 WULC-LP in Hendersonville, North Carolina
 WVFV-LP in Roanoke Rapids, North Carolina
  in Liberty, New York
  in Glen Burnie, Maryland
  in Pillager, Minnesota
 WYNE-LP in Wayne, New Jersey
  in Caledonia, Ohio
 WZYE-LP in Maplewood, New Jersey

References

Lists of radio stations by frequency